John William Corrin  (6 January 1932 – 6 April 2019) was a First Deemster of the Isle of Man.

Biography 
He was educated at King William's College.  He was called to the Manx bar in 1954.  He rose to Senior Partner at Dickinson Cruickshank & Co.

He served as Attorney General and Member of the Legislative Council of the Isle of Man from 1974 to 1980, when he became Second Deemster.  He succeeded as First Deemster and Clerk of the Roles in 1988, serving until 1998.

In 1998, he was elected a Freeman of the Borough of Douglas.

He died on 6 April 2019 at the age of 87.

Judiciary positions

Attorney General, 1974-1980
Second Deemster, 1980-1988
First Deemster and Clerk of the Rolls, 1988-1998

References

2019 deaths
Manx politicians
Manx judges
Manx lawyers
People educated at King William's College
Commanders of the Order of the British Empire
1932 births